Bukowska Wola is a village in the administrative district of Gmina Miechów, within Miechów County, Lesser Poland Voivodeship, in southern Poland.

The village has a population of 490.

References

Bukowska Wola